Eoophyla tetropalis is a moth in the family Crambidae. It was described by George Hampson in 1906. It is found in Cameroon, Ghana, Ivory Coast, Kenya, Nigeria, Sierra Leone and Uganda.

The costa of the forewings is blackish in the basal half, interrupted with yellow. The base is white. There is a dark fuscous subbasal dot on the dorsum and a yellowish antemedian fascia, as well as two parallel fuscous lines. The base of the hindwings is white, with a yellow subbasal fascia and a white scattering of dark fuscous scales. Adults have been recorded on wing from April to July, September and from November to February.

References

tetropalis
Moths described in 1906
Moths of Africa